Samartín de Güerces (in Spanish, San Martín de Huerces) is a parish of the municipality of Gijón / Xixón, in Asturias, Spain.

Its population was 313 in 2012.

Samartín de Güerces borders the municipality of Siero in the south and with the districts of Vega and Llavandera in the east. Its highest peak is Picu Samartín (513 m)

Villages and their neighbourhoods
Cagüezo
La Cruz
La Ilesia
El Molín de Cagüezo
El Monte
La Gotera
La Marquesa
El Monte Pangrán
La Torre
Santecía
La Fayona
La Gola
Llagos
El Xigal
Villaverde
Colloto
El Trechoru

External links
 Official Toponyms - Principality of Asturias website.
 Official Toponyms: Laws - BOPA Nº 229 - Martes, 3 de octubre de 2006 & DECRETO 105/2006, de 20 de septiembre, por el que se determinan los topónimos oficiales del concejo de Gijón.

Parishes in Gijón